Hum Se Hai Zamana is a 1983 Indian Hindi-language film, directed and produced by Deepak Bahry. It stars Mithun Chakraborty, Danny Denzongpa, Amjad Khan as lead heroes and Zeenat Aman, Kim, Kajal Kiran as their heroines respectively. Ranjeet has played the villain here. While the film did have a cast of well-known actors and actresses at the time, the movie ultimately failed to be a success at the box office.

Plot
Tired of his older wife and son, the Thakur (Kamal Kapoor) remarries a much younger woman, and throws his wife and son out of his palatial house. His employees, led by Kalicharan (Shriram Lagoo), go on a strike, demanding higher pay and benefits, which are unacceptable to the Thakur. He invites Kalicharan to meet with him, offers him money, and when Kalicharan refuses, he has him killed. His second wife gives birth to a baby girl, Nisha (Zeenat Aman), and passes away. Years later, his past comes to haunt him when the sons of Kalicharan, Shiva (Mithun Chakraborty) and Karan (Danny Denzongpa), along with their widowed mother, seek revenge against him. To make matters worse, Nisha refuses to marry Ranjeet Ranvir Singh (Ranjeet), the man Thakur has chosen for her, for she loves Shiva; and the ultimate showdown between the Thakur and his now grown son, Iqbal (Amjad Khan) and Iqbal's lover (Kajal Kiran) and with Thakur's first wife.

Cast
Mithun Chakraborty as Shiva
Danny Denzongpa as Karan
Amjad Khan as Iqbal 
Zeenat Aman as Nisha
Kim as Sona
Kajal Kiran as Chhutki
Ranjeet as Ranjeet Singh
Kamal Kapoor as Thakur Pratap Singh
Shreeram Lagoo as Kalicharan
Pinchoo Kapoor as Ranveer Singh

Reception 
The movie was rated a 6.5/10 by IMDb.

While its cast was full of stars at the time, the film ultimately did not perform well at the box office, and the movie was a flop.

The movie brought more credibility to actress Kim, a rising star who starred in films such as Disco Dancer and Naseeb the year before. She was famed for her acting as Sona, and for her bikini scene in the film where she makes a failed escape attempt from a river after being pursued by bandits.

Soundtrack

The songs in the movie, “Gustakhi Maaf Ho”, “Hum Se Na Takrana, Hum Se Hai Zamana,” and “Tainu Mainu Vekhe Zamana,” received much attention, and were popular prior to the movie's release.

 Track listing

References

External links 
• Hum Se Hai Zamana on IMDb

1983 films
1980s Hindi-language films
1983 Western (genre) films
Films scored by Raamlaxman
Indian Western (genre) films